Gabrielle Lisa Williams (born September 9, 1996) is an American-French professional basketball player for the Seattle Storm of the Women's National Basketball Association (WNBA). She was drafted 4th overall by the Chicago Sky in the 2018 WNBA draft. In 2022 she was a EuroLeague champion with Sopron and was named the Final Four MVP. Williams played forward for the UConn women's basketball team, and won back to back national championships in 2015 and 2016.

Career

High school career basketball 
Williams is the daughter of Matthew and Therese Williams and played basketball at Edward C. Reed High School in Sparks, Nevada. As a sophomore she averaged 18 points, 10 rebounds, and seven steals per game in leading Reed to the Class 4A state title. Williams had 15 points, 14 rebounds, and six assists in a semifinal win over Foothill, then had 24 points, four rebounds, and four assists in the championship game win over Reno and was named the Las Vegas Review-Journal Class 4A state Player of the Year. During her junior year, Williams was averaging 30 points, 11 rebounds, six assists, and seven blocked shots per game when she suffered a completely torn anterior cruciate ligament and partially-torn meniscus in her right knee on Jan. 19 just 30-seconds into a game against rival Reno High. She had season-ending surgery Feb. 11 and was cleared to return to full basketball activity Oct. 10.

High school career track and field 
Williams was a very accomplished multi-event track and field athlete. She was named the Gatorade Nevada Girls Track & Field Athlete of the Year, honoring the best track and field athlete in high school while still a freshman. She competed in the state meet, finishing second in the 100 meter hurdles and third in the 300 meter hurdles as well as helping the 4 x 400 meter relay team finish second. She cleared 5'8" in the high jump, which ranked number 36 among all high school players in the nation. As a sophomore, she repeated as the Gatorade Nevada Girls Track & Field Athlete of the Year. At the state championships, she won the 100 meter hurdles as well as the 300 meter hurdles and cleared 5'11" to win the high jump. At a regional meet she cleared 6 feet 1.5 inches, which ranked as the top performance among high school competitors at the time and was second best among all of Division I. At the Olympic trials in 2012, she cleared 6 feet 2 1/4 inches to finish in fifth place among all competitors, while still too young to be eligible for the US world Junior team, although she qualified as an alternate for the 2012 London Olympics.

College career

Williams helped UConn reach a 148–3 record over her four-year career, which included four Final Four appearances and back to back National Championships. She had one of only five Huskies triple-doubles in school history. One of only eight Huskies, along with Tina Charles, Rebecca Lobo, Maya Moore, Stefanie Dolson, Jamelle Elliott, Breanna Stewart and Napheesa Collier with at least 1,000 points and 1,000 rebounds. Williams finished her career 22nd on UConn's all-time scoring list at 1,582 career points, seventh with 1,007 career rebounds, 13th in assists (481) and fifth in steals (305). Williams was named the 2017 American Athletic Conference and WBCA NCAA Division I Defensive Player of the Year and 2018 Lowe's Senior Class Award.

Awards and honors 

 2017–United States Basketball Writers Association All-America Team
 2017–WBCA Defensive Player of the Year
 2017–AP All-American second team
 2017–AAC Defensive Player of the Year
 2017–NCAA Tournament - All Tournament Team

WNBA
Williams was drafted 4th overall in the 2018 WNBA Draft by the Chicago Sky. 
On May 9, 2021, it was announced that Williams was traded to the Los Angeles Sparks. On February 3, 2022, Williams was acquired by the Seattle Storm in a trade that sent Katie Lou Samuelson, and the 9th overall pick in 2022 WNBA Draft to the Sparks.

Overseas career
In 2018, Williams signed with Dike Basket Napoli of the Italian First Division. In January 2019, after the week 14th her team withdrew from the championships. Williams signed to Spar CityLift Girona in late February 2019 to replace Shay Murphy, who left the team for family reasons and returned to the United States. With Girona, she won the 2018–19 Spanish First Division.

Sopron Basket
On 15 May 2020, Williams signed to Sopron Basket with former UConn teammate Megan Walker. On April 10, 2022, Williams won the 2021–22 EuroLeague Women championship with Sopron Basket, while being named Final Four MVP after the final.

ASVEL Féminin
On 15 June 2022, Williams signed to LDLC ASVEL.

Career statistics

College

WNBA

Regular season 

|-
| style='text-align:left;'|2018
| style='text-align:left;'|Chicago
| 34 || 30 || 23.0 || .432 || .269 || .783 || 4.3 || 1.6 || 1.6 || 0.2 || 1.1 || 7.3
|-
| style='text-align:left;'|2019
| style='text-align:left;'|Chicago
| 33 || 2 || 16.0 || .414 || .171 || .725 || 2.2 || 2.1 || 0.7 || 0.2 || 1.7 || 5.6
|-
| style='text-align:left;'|2020
| style='text-align:left;'|Chicago
| 22 || 4 || 24.8 || .424 || .286 || .640 || 4.0 || 2.0 || 1.3 || 0.2 || 1.7 || 7.7
|-
| style='text-align:left;'|2022
| style='text-align:left;'|Seattle
| 36 || 36 || 25.6 || .444 || .257 || .778 || 5.0 || 3.1 || 1.5 || 0.4 || 1.4 || 7.5
|-
| style='text-align:left;'|Career
| style='text-align:left;'|4 years, 2 teams
| 125 || 72 || 22.2 || .430 || .251 || .744 || 3.9 || 2.2 || 1.3 || 0.3 || 1.5 || 7.0

Playoffs 

|-
| style='text-align:left;'|2019
| style='text-align:left;'|Chicago
| 2 || 0 || 9.5 || .250 || .000 || 1.000 || 0.5 || 3.0 || 2.0 || 0.0 || 0.0 || 3.0
|-
| style='text-align:left;'|2020
| style='text-align:left;'|Chicago
| 1 || 0 || 32.0 || .429 || .400 || 1.000 || 5.0 || 2.0 || 2.0 || 0.0 || 1.0 || 16.0
|-
| style='text-align:left;'|2022
| style='text-align:left;'|Seattle
| 4 || 4 || 25.3 || .667 || .333 || .857 || 4.0 || 2.8 || 1.5 || 0.3 || 1.5 || 10.0
|-
| style='text-align:left;'|Career
| style='text-align:left;'|3 years, 2 teams
| 7 || 4 || 21.7 || .522 || .333 || .909 || 3.1 || 2.7 || 1.4 || 0.1 || 1.0 || 8.9

Overseas

National competition

Regular season

* 2019–20 LFB season interrupted after the 16th round due to COVID-19 pandemic

Playoffs

Olympics 
Although Williams was born and raised in the United States, her mother is French and she has extended family living in France, so she qualified for inclusion on the French national team. Her Olympic experience was not her first experience with the French team,  as she played for Les Bleues in the 2021 Eurobasket competition, helping the team to win silver. Williams averaged 8.2 points per game in that competition.

The decision to play for the Olympic team was not without cost. Many of the Olympic players, not just for the USA, but for several other teams play for the WNBA, whose regular-season typically runs through the summer months. To accommodate the Olympics, the WNBA typically takes a month-long break in the season during Olympic years. However, William's commitments to the French national team interfered with her ability to show up at training camp for the Chicago Sky. She told ESPN's Mechelle Voepel that she thought she had reached an understanding with the team regarding her commitments but the team disagreed, suspended her from the team and traded her to the Los Angeles Sparks. She will be a member of the Sparks now that the Olympics are over, but because she was suspended, she is ineligible to play the season so her decision to play for the French national team cost her an entire WNBA season.

In the opening game of the preliminary rounds, France faced Japan. France was ranked fifth in the world at the time while Japan was 10th, but Japan was playing in their home country, and upset France 74–70. Williams played 31 minutes, more than any other player on her team. France was allocated to group B, which also included the USA and Nigeria. While France could advance even with a loss to the USA, they would not advance to the knockout stage if they lost to Nigeria, so they found themselves in a must win situation in just their second game. France "righted the ship .. against Nigeria", winning 87–62. Williams had 13 points and nine rebounds (tied for top on the team) just missing a double double. She also led the team in steals.

In the game against USA, which has never lost an Olympic game, the Americans again prevailed, but France kept the game close, finally losing 93–82. Voepel noted that Williams was called a "Swiss Army knife" due to her versatility, and this game epitomizes that appellation. She was the only member of the French team to record results in five statistical categories: points (10), rebounds (5), assists (3), steals (6), and blocks (1). In the knockout round, France faced Spain and just managed to come away with a win 67-64. Williams was one of the two French players with double-digit scoring, recording 11 points in 29 minutes. The semi-final match was against Japan who had never won an Olympic medal but was now playing for a chance to make it to the gold-medal game on their home territory. Japan won 87–71. Williams played a team-high 26 minutes and recorded eight rebounds, more than any other player on either team.

In the bronze medal game, France faced Serbia, who had beaten France for the Eurobasket championship less than two months earlier. Serbia started out strong, and led 23–19 at the end of the first quarter. France battled back, taking the lead with less than a minute left in the half. They never relinquished the lead and ended up winning by 15 points 91–76. While Williams had played well up to this point, she saved her best for last, hitting four of her five three-point attempts, tying for the team lead in assists and the only player on her team to record a block and a steal in the game. She was the leading scorer for her team with 17 points.

References

External links

 Career statistics from NCAA.org and Basketball-Reference.com
 UConn player profile 

1996 births
Living people
All-American college women's basketball players
American women's basketball players
French women's basketball players
French people of American descent
American people of French descent
American expatriate basketball people in Spain
American expatriate basketball people in France
American expatriate basketball people in Italy
American expatriate basketball people in Hungary
Basketball players at the 2020 Summer Olympics
Basketball players from Nevada
Chicago Sky draft picks
Chicago Sky players
French expatriate basketball people in Spain
French expatriate basketball people in Italy
Olympic basketball players of France
Power forwards (basketball)
Seattle Storm players
Sportspeople from Sparks, Nevada
UConn Huskies women's basketball players
Medalists at the 2020 Summer Olympics
Olympic medalists in basketball
Olympic bronze medalists for France